S. V. Institute of Management, Kadi (SVIM) is an institute of Sarva Vidhyalaya Kelavani Mandal, Kadi. It was established in 2002. It is a constituent college of Kadi Sarva Vishwavidyalaya (KSV), Gandhinagar.

History – Sarva Vidyalaya Kelvani Mandal 
Parent educational trust Sarva Vidhyalaya Kelavani Mandal, Kadi was established in 1919 by the social reformer and patron of education venerable Shri Chhaganlal Pitambardas Patel, popularly known as "Chhaganbha". The chanting mantra "Kar Bhala Hoga Bhala", conceptualized by Shri Chhaganbha, is the guiding spirit of the institution and is well reflected in the broad activities pursued by the trust. With a history of 96 years, Sarva Vidyalaya Kelvani Mandal is one of the oldest educational trusts of India.

The trust runs various schools at primary, secondary, and higher secondary levels and offers various electives like science, arts, and commerce, etc. At the graduate level, the trust has established institutes which are offering vocational, professional and mainstream courses like B.Sc, BA, B.Com, MAM, MCM, B.Ed, PTC, ITI, etc. In last two decades, the trust has started professional programs like MBA, MCA, BE, B.Pharm, Nursing, etc.

Mahatma Gandhi visited this Campus in 1929 and communicated one message to society "Provide the opportunity to your Children to get the best education at Sarva Vidyalaya". Sir Sayajirao III visited the campus in 1926 and announced the donation of Rs. 3000/- per year to Sarva Vidyalaya. The Trust is governed by Alumni who have studied in various schools and colleges and are occupying prominent positions. The government of Gujarat has granted a total land of 1, 32,000 Sq.m for the development of Schools and Colleges in Gandhinagar. The Trust offers many common facilities like Transportation, a common playground, and a centrally AC library. It has state of the art conference hall with an inbuilt sound system and projector. There is also "Sanskar Bhavan" for various cultural activities.

Programmes
MBA – MASTER OF BUSINESS ADMINISTRATION 
MBA(I) – MASTER OF BUSINESS MANAGEMENT (INTEGRATED)

Constituent College of Kadi Sarva Vishwavidyalaya, Gandhinagar 
Kadi Sarva Vishwavidyalaya is a University established vide Gujarat State Government Act 21 of 2007 in May 2007 and approved by UGC (ref f. 9-18/2008(cpp-1) 19 March 2009). The  university has been set up by Sarva Vidyalaya Kelavani Mandal. With the efforts and contribution of  Late Shree Maneklal  M Patel. The university also got success in the amalgamation of all three campuses of Gandhinagar and Kadi with constituent colleges campus of Kadi  Sarva Vishwavidyalaya in March 2012. The founder of Sarva Vidyalaya Kelavani Mandal "Pujya Chhaganbha" and Late visionary Chairman Shree Maneklal M. Patel always believed in providing education to all irrespective of caste, creed and religion, which is carried forward successfully by the university officer bearer today.

Kadi Sarva Vishwavidyalaya offers Post-Graduate courses in 25 different disciplines like MBA, MCA, ME, M. Pharm. M.Sc. (Chemistry, Physics, Mathematics, Nursing, Bio-Technology, IT), M.Ed., M.A., etc., Graduation level courses in 17 different disciplines viz. B.E., B. Pharm., BBA, BCA, B.Sc.(Chemistry, Mathematics, Bio-technology, Nursing, Physics), B. Voc. etc. diploma course in 7 disciplines. Kadi Sarva Vishwavidyalaya has become a pioneer in registering Doctoral students with 17 major disciplines like Management, Engineering, Pharmacy, Computer Science, Biotechnology, Mathematics, Physics, Chemistry, English, Psychology, Physical Education and many more. KSV also offers M.Phil. courses in 5 disciplines ranging from computer science to English Language. KSV also initiated the centers of excellence and rope in Incubation Center for promoting industry centric relevant research, Simulation center for Replicating industry situation and events so students may have hand-on-feel experience and III-C (Industry-Institute-Interaction Cell) for quality Final placement, internship and project placements/

Antarnad 
Antarnad – the voice of soul is a social initiative of S. V. Institute of Management, Kadi. Under this group institute is organizing social activities. In the year 2013–14 following activities have been done:
 Visit of Bharti Ashram, an old age home at Sarkhej, Ahmedabad on 4 August 2013, Friendship day. We have distributed fruits among the elders and tied a friendship belt to them. Afterwards we had words with elders and learned from their experiences. Almost three (3) hrs were spent with them and got golden advices for life.
 Antarnad Group had successfully run awareness campaign among 18,000 students of Sarva Vidyalaya Campus, Kadi. The message of celebrating Uttarayan with responsibility towards other living beings especially innocent and beautiful birds has been spread and well received through severe poster campaigning in the entire campus area.
 SVIM- Antarnad Celebrated Friendship Day on 3 August 2014 With Mentally Challenged School Children at Prakash School, Thaltej, Ahmedabad BY tying Friendship Belts to them, distributing chocolates and food packets and playing games with them.
 "SAVE BIRDS DURING UTTARAYAN" - Antarnad Group appeals its students, alumnus, students from peer institutes in S V Campus KADI and all citizens at large to Save Birds during Uttarayan. SVIM successfully run awareness campaign among 20,000 students of Sarva Vidyalaya Campus, Kadi.

References 

Universities and colleges in Gujarat
Mehsana district